Shan George is a Nollywood actress, singer, film producer and director. Prior to debuting in the movie Thorns of Rose, she had previously featured in a 1997 soap opera titled Winds of Destiny. She is best known for her role in the movies Outkast and Welcome to Nollywood.

Life and career
Shan George was born on 21st of April 1970. She was born in Ediba, a town in Abi local government area of Cross River State, Nigeria; Shan was born to a Nigerian mother and a British father. Controversial for having issues with her "love life", her first marriage was when she was 16. She attended Edanafa Secondary Commercial School, Ediba, Cross River, Nigeria. She is an alumnus of the University of Lagos where she studied Mass Communication and went on to produce her debut movie titled All For Winnie during her final year. Shan George is a renowned Nollywood actress,  singer, film maker and director before debuting in the movie thorns of Rose.

In 2010, Shan released her debut studio album titled Dance which got positive reviews from music critics. She presently has two children after being involved in several broken marriages. She is also the Founder/CEO of a tuition-free film school, Divine Shield Film Academy in Calabar, Nigeria.

Selected filmography

Soaps
 Winds Of Destiny
 After The Storm
Super Story (Revenge)

Films
 Thorns Of Rose
 All For Winnie
 A Second Time
 Outcast
 Blood Diamonds
 Welcome to Nollywood
 Travails of Fate
 Made in Heaven
 General's Wife
 Wrong Number
 My Sweat
 London Forever
 Super Zebraman
 Highway To The Grave
 Silent Killer
 High Street Girls
 A Second Time
 Grand Mother
 Passionate Crime
 One Good Man
 Do Good
AWARDS AND NOMINATIONS

 Mоѕt Aссlаіmеd Aсtrеѕѕ іn Nіgеrіа аt thе Аfrіса Моvіе Асаdеmу Аwаrdѕ (AMAA)
Bеѕt Aсtrеѕѕ іn Nіgеrіа аt thе Аfrіса Маgіс Vіеwеrѕ Сhоісе Аwаrdѕ (AMVCA)
Recipient of the Best Actreѕs Award аt thе Gоldеn Ісоn Моvіе Асаdеmу Аwаrdѕ (GIAMA)
Nominated for the Best Act, Female (English) on the Cross River Movie Awards (CRIMA) – 2013
Best Director on the Cross River Nollywood Awards (CRINA) – 2014
Movie of the Year on the Cross River Nollywood Awards (CRINA) – 2014
Best Producer on the Cross River Nollywood Awards (CRINA) – 2014
Award Recipient on the Calabar Entertainment Conference (CEC) – 2019
Actor of The Week by Don Dollar Entertainment – 2019
Award Recipient on the Anneozeng Ogozi Aid Foundation (AOAF) – 2019

See also
 List of Nigerian film producers

References

External links
 

Living people
1970 births
Actresses from Cross River State
Nigerian film actresses
University of Lagos alumni
Nigerian film producers
21st-century Nigerian women singers
Nigerian film directors
20th-century Nigerian actresses
Nigerian people of British descent
21st-century Nigerian actresses
Nigerian women film producers
Nigerian women film directors
20th-century births
Nigerian women singers
Nigerian television actresses
Nigerian women in business
Nigerian businesspeople
Nigerian chief executives